Marqueece L. Harris-Dawson (born November 7, 1969) is an American politician who currently represents the 8th district of the Los Angeles City Council since 2015.

Early life and education 
Harris-Dawson was born and raised in South Central Los Angeles to William Dawson, minister, and Cheryl Dawson, a clerk. Councilmember Harris-Dawson grew up in South Los Angeles during the crack cocaine epidemic. His family moved from their neighborhood to protect their children from police and gang violence.

Harris-Dawson graduated from Morehouse College with a Bachelor's Degree in Political Science and Mathematics. Harris-Dawson holds a certificate in non-profit management from the Stanford Graduate School of Business, and is an Aspen Institute Pahara Fellow.

Career 
Harris-Dawson's first campaign as a community organizer was to change the conditions of schools in South Los Angeles and to infuse equity in the distribution of education funding. As a result of the campaign, South Los Angeles schools received an investment of $153 million for repair and modernization. He served as its President and CEO  from 2004 to 2014. In 1995, he joined Community Coalition under founder Karen Bass. Harris-Dawson was the coordinator for the 1999 re-election campaign of Mark Ridley-Thomas in District 2 of the Los Angeles County Board of Supervisors .

Los Angeles City Council (2015—)

Elections 
In the primary election for District 8 in 2015, Harris-Dawson received over 62% of the vote for the vacant seat.    Because Harris-Dawson won outright, a general election for District 8 was not needed. Term limits forced Bernard C. Parks, Harris-Dawson's predecessor since 2004, out of office.

Proposition HHH
In 2016, Councilmember Harris-Dawson co-authored Proposition HHH, a $1.2 billion bond measure to build permanent supportive housing for homeless people and people at risk of becoming homeless. The measure appeared on the November 2016 municipal ballot and passed, with voters approving the measure 77% to 23%.

References

External links 
 Official Councilmember Marqueece Harris-Dawson—Los Angeles City Council District 8 website
 City of Los Angeles: Map of District 8

Los Angeles City Council members
African-American people in California politics
California Democrats
1970 births
Living people
People from South Los Angeles
21st-century American politicians
21st-century African-American politicians
20th-century African-American people